NorthTowne Square, briefly known as Lakeside Centre, was a shopping mall in Toledo, Ohio developed by Simon Property Group.

The three-anchor tenant mall opened in 1981 near the Ohio-Michigan border in anticipation of a home construction boom on the Michigan side, but faced serious business problems by the early 2000s. Simon put the mall up for sale in 1999 and sold the property in 2002. The mall closed in 2005, city government acquired the building in 2011 and demolished it in 2013.

In 2021, the City of Toledo announced the site would be sold to NorthPoint Development with intentions to build a $70 million industrial park with a spring 2022 groundbreaking.

History

North Towne Square was developed in 1980 by Simon Property Group of Indianapolis, Indiana. The mall was located on the north side of Toledo, on Telegraph Road (US-24), less than a mile from the Michigan/Ohio state line. Originally, its anchor stores included two local department stores, Lasalle's and The Lion Store, as well as Montgomery Ward. After only two years in business at North Towne Square, Lasalle's began operating under the Macy's name. R.H. Macy & Co., which had owned Lasalle's since 1923, sold their Toledo area stores to Dayton's Elder-Beerman in 1984.

Because of its proximity to the Michigan border, the mall drew customers from southeastern Michigan as well. The 1988 opening of Frenchtown Square Mall in Monroe, Michigan significantly reduced the amount of traffic coming from Michigan to North Towne. Expansions at Franklin Park Mall and a declining economy in Toledo, both factored into North Towne Square's demise as well. Many of North Towne Square's chain tenants moved to Franklin Park or Frenchtown Square, being replaced by local stores.

Loss of anchor stores

Elder-Beerman filed for Chapter 11 bankruptcy in 1995. As a condition of emerging from bankruptcy, Elder Beerman reduced operations at its North Towne store: first closing off the store's restaurant, and then by converting the upper level to a clearance center before the store was closed in 1997. Two years later, Dillard's acquired all of The Lion Store's locations in Toledo and converted them to the Dillard's name. Two years later, Dillard's closed as well, leaving the mall with only a single anchor store. The mall's movie theater complex was also closed by the early 2000s. Montgomery Ward closed its store at North Towne Square in 2002 as a result of Ward's bankruptcy.

By 2002, the mall's largest tenant was MC Sports, and only 20 other stores operated within.

Redevelopment and closure

In 2003, the mall was renamed Lakeside Centre as part of a redevelopment plan. The remaining tenants' leases were terminated in early 2005. By February of that year, the entire complex was closed, as its owners decided that electrical costs were too high to keep the largely vacant complex open. During the last five months prior to closure and after the mall's closure, a portion of the parking lot was used to store the excess inventory at a nearby Chrysler dealership.

Walmart proposed building a store on the site of the vacant mall in 2007. These plans were opposed by David Ball, candidate for city council.

On February 24, 2010, Toledo issued a Notice of Condemnation by Mayor Mike Bell and David Golis, P.E. Chief of Building. A water main break had damaged adjacent businesses (mainly Super Fitness Center), and the mall's owners owed delinquent taxes of nearly $86,000. The city ordered the mall's owners, who were based in California, to repair all areas damaged by water as a result of the water line break. The clean-up would include removal of all evidence of mold inside the building.

In April 2012, it was announced that demolition of North Towne Square Mall would commence the following month at a cost of $600,000. Demolition began in January 2013, and was completed several months later. A new wall was added to Super Fitness, making it a stand-alone building. The original floors, parking lot, and lamp posts still remain.

References

Shopping malls in the Toledo, Ohio metro area
Shopping malls established in 1980
Shopping malls disestablished in 2005
Demolished shopping malls in the United States
Buildings and structures in Toledo, Ohio
Economy of Toledo, Ohio
Buildings and structures demolished in 2013
Demolished buildings and structures in Ohio